Drive Inn is a collaboration album with Rainer Bloss and Klaus Schulze.

There exists an album called Drive Inn II, but despite the fact that Schulze's name is put on the cover, it is a Rainer Bloss solo project. Furthermore, there exists a Drive Inn III by Rainer Bloss. Klaus Schulze has nothing to do with it or any other of Rainer Bloss' solo recordings.

Track listing
All tracks by Rainer Bloss & Klaus Schulze

 "Drive Inn" – 03:42
 "Sightseeing" – 06:24
 "Truckin'" – 04:54
 "Highway" – 04:45
 "Racing" – 06:00
 "Road Clear" – 11:11
 "Drive Out" – 03:00

Personnel 
Rainer Bloss – synthesizer, keyboards, producer
Claus Cordes – design
Ernst Fuchs – vocals
Michael Garvens – percussion, vocals
Klaus Schulze – synthesizer, guitar, keyboards, vocals, engineer, electronics

References

External links
 Drive Inn at the official site of Klaus Schulze
 

1984 albums
Klaus Schulze albums